Thomas Peyton (1828–1912) was a fisherman, civil servant and politician in Newfoundland. He represented Twillingate in the Newfoundland House of Assembly from 1889 to 1893 as a Liberal.

The son of John Peyton Jr. and Eleanor Mahoney, he was born on Exploits Burnt Island. Peyton married Ann Pearce of Twillingate. He managed the family salmon fishery on the Exploits River. He was a justice of the peace and also served as a deputy land surveyor on the geological survey of Newfoundland by Alexander Murray. Peyton was briefly magistrate at Pilley's Island and served as  fishery warden on rivers on Notre Dame Bay.

He is credited with the discovery of copper deposits at Green Bay in 1875.

He died at Twillingate in 1912.

His son Ernest was the first Newfoundland member of the Royal North-West Mounted Police. His niece, Georgina Stirling, was an opera singer known as the "Nightingale of the North".

References 

Members of the Newfoundland and Labrador House of Assembly
1828 births
1912 deaths
Newfoundland Colony judges